Mel Byars (born in Columbia, South Carolina), is an American design historian.

Byars studied journalism in the 1950s at the University of South Carolina. He subsequently settled in New York City and eventually became active as an art director or creative director for a number of publishers, such as Prentice-Hall and McGraw-Hill, and for advertising agencies, including Leber Katz Partners (subsumed into Foote, Cone & Belding, the world's second oldest advertising agency, founded 1873). In the early 1980s, he studied anthropology under Stanley Diamond (1921–1991) in the master's-degree program of The New School for Social Research. And, previously there, he was enrolled in the School of Media Studies.

A decade later, he turned to the history of applied art/industrial design and served as the archivist of the Thérèse Bonney Photography Collection (images of 1925-35 French decorative arts and other subjects) in New York's Cooper-Hewitt National Design Museum and has been a major donor of 20th-century objects to the museum's permanent collection. He has made other donations to the Museum of Decorative Arts in Prague (Uměleckoprůmyslová museum v Praze), Israel Museum, Musée des Arts Décoratifs, Paris, and Columbia Museum of Art.

Byars has taught at Pratt Institute and Fashion Institute of Technology (FIT) in New York City and Bezalel Academy of Arts and Design and Holon Institute of Technology in Israel and at others as well as lectured widely while remaining active in the advertising sector. From 2017 to 2019, he wrote a column for Elephant art and culture magazine.

Awards/works

Byars's most significant work is the second edition (2004) of The Design Encyclopedia, which won the Besterman/McColvin Gold Medal for the best reference book of 2004 from the British Chartered Institute of Library and Information Professionals. When active in graphic design earlier in his career, he won a number of awards, including from the Art Directors Club of New York and had works published in various books such as 100 Years of Dance Posters and Dance Posters.

In addition to The Design Encyclopedia, other literary works include more than a dozen books, essays for various design-exhibition catalogs, book introductions and articles for I.D., Beaux Arts, Clear, Echoes, Graphis, form, and other periodicals. A number of the books have been translated into Japanese, Chinese, Spanish, Italian, French, Portuguese, and Hebrew.

Bibliography

 "What Makes American Design American?", introduction in reprint, R.L. Leonard and C.A. Glassgold, eds., Mocern American Design by the American Union of Decorative Artists & Craftsmen, New York: Ives Washburn, 1930 (reprint New York: Acanthus, 1992) | 
 Introduction in Bořek Šípek: blízkost dálky, architektura a design = the nearness of far, architecture and design, exhibition cat., Amsterdam: Steltman, 1993, in English, Czech, and Japanese | 
 The Design Encyclopedia, New York: John Wiley, 1994 | 
 50 Chairs: Innovations in Design Materials (Introduction by Alexander von Vegesack), Hove, UK: RotoVision, 1996 | 
 50 Lights: Innovations in Design and Materials (Introduction by Paola Antonelli), Hove, UK: RotoVision, 1997 | 
 Tropical Modern: The Designs of Fernando and Humberto Campana, Mel Byars, ed., et al., New York: Acanthus Press, 1998 | 
 50 Tables: Innovations in Design and Materials (Introduction by Sylvain Dubuisson), Hove, UK: RotoVision, 1998 | 
 50 Products: Innovation in Design and Materials (Introduction by David Revere McFadden), New York: Watson-Guptill, 1998 | 
 100 Designs/100 Years: A Celebration of the 20th Century (with Arlette Barré-Despond), Hove, UK: RotoVision, 1999 | 
 50 Sport Wares. Innovations in Design and Materials (Introduction by Aaron Betsky), Hove, UK: RotoVision, 1999 | 
 On/Off: New Electronic Products, New York: Universe Books, and Kempen: teNeues, 2001 | 
 50 Beds: Innovations in Design and Materials (Introduction by Brice d'Antras), Hove, UK: RotoVision, 2001 | 
 Design in Steel, London: Laurence King, 2003 | 
 The Design Encyclopedia (Foreword by Terence Riley), New York: The Museum of Modern Art, 2004 | 
 New Chairs: Innovations in Design, Technology, and Materials, San Francisco: Chronicle Books, and London: Laurence King, 2006 | 
 Improvisation: New Israeli Design (אימפרוביזציה - עיצוב חדש בישראל), Tel Aviv: The Haim Rubin Tel Aviv University Press, 2007 (in Hebrew) |

References

External links
CILIP 2005 Besterman McColvin award list
Wilson Laminate - The Statement 
Haaretz newspaper, "Masters of improvisation," Yuval Saar
 

21st-century American historians
21st-century American male writers
Writers from Columbia, South Carolina
1938 births
Living people
Fashion Institute of Technology faculty
Pratt Institute faculty
American male non-fiction writers